Cole Thomas Van Lanen (born April 23, 1998) is an American football offensive guard for the Jacksonville Jaguars of the National Football League (NFL). He played college football at Wisconsin.

Professional career

Green Bay Packers
On May 1, 2021, Van Lanen was selected 214th overall by the Green Bay Packers in the 2021 NFL Draft. On May 13, 2021, Packers signed Van Lanen to a four-year rookie deal.
On August 31, 2021, Packers released Van Lanen as part of their final roster cuts. He was signed to the practice squad the next day. He was elevated to the active roster on December 18 ahead of a week 15 game against Baltimore Ravens. On January 25, 2022, he signed a reserve/future contract with the Packers.

Jacksonville Jaguars
On August 24, 2022, Van Lanen was traded to the Jacksonville Jaguars for a seventh-round draft pick.

References

External links
Jacksonville Jaguars bio
Wisconsin Badgers bio

Living people
1998 births
American football offensive linemen
Green Bay Packers players
Jacksonville Jaguars players
Wisconsin Badgers football players
Players of American football from Wisconsin
Sportspeople from Green Bay, Wisconsin